Ekaterina or Yekaterina Ryabova may refer to:
Ekaterina Ryabova (singer) (born 1997), Russian singer
Ekaterina Ryabova (figure skater) (born 2003), Russian-Azerbaijani figure skater
Yekaterina Ryabova (1921–1974), Soviet aviator